The road network in Belize consists of over  of roads, of which approximately  is paved.

Highways 

Belize has five major asphalt-paved two-lane roads:
 Philip Goldson Highway  between Belize City and the Mexican border north of Corozal
 George Price Highway  between Belize City and the Guatemalan border near Benque Viejo del Carmen
 Hummingbird Highway from Belmopan to Dangriga
 Thomas Vincent Ramos Highway from Dangriga to Punta Gorda (97 miles or  157 kilometres)
 Manuel Esquivel Highway from Dangriga to La Democracia, Belize 
 John Smith Highway from Western Paradise to Philip S. W. Goldson International Airport

References

External links
Drivers Guide To Belize
Belize Bus Schedules